Turning Point: Stalingrad is a board game published in 1989 by Avalon Hill.

Publication history
It was the third game in Avalon Hill's area movement series of detailed simulation wargames.

Gameplay
The game simulates the strategic situation in the Battle of Stalingrad during the period 13 September 1942 – 3 October 1942.

Reception
Ellis Simpson reviewed Turning Point: Stalingrad for Games International magazine, and gave it 5 stars out of 5, and stated that "Of the year's wargame releases, this is my favourite and deserves to be yours too. Each playing is different, each turn within a game is different and no two games are ever going to be the same."

References

Avalon Hill games
Board games
World War II board wargames